West Coast Conference Tournament may refer to:

West Coast Conference Men's Basketball Tournament, the men's basketball championship tournament
West Coast Conference Women's Basketball Tournament, the women's basketball championship tournament